Manot (lit. Portions) is a moshav in northern Israel. Located near Shlomi, it falls under the jurisdiction of Ma'ale Yosef Regional Council.

History
The moshav was established in 1980 by residents of other local moshavim, with assistance from the Jewish Agency. It was named after the ruins of a  settlement in the area, also called Manot.

References

Moshavim
Populated places established in 1980
Populated places in Northern District (Israel)
1980 establishments in Israel